The 1915 Copa del Rey Final was the 15th final of the Spanish cup competition, the Copa del Rey. The final was played at Estadio de Amute in Irun on 2 May 1915. The match was won by Athletic Bilbao, who beat RCD Español 5–0. The star of the match was Bilbao's Pichichi, who scored a hat-trick to help his side clutch a 5–0 win.

Details

References

External links
linguasport.com
RSSSF.com

1915
1914–15 in Spanish football
Athletic Bilbao matches
RCD Espanyol matches